Bodden are briny bodies of water often forming lagoons, along the southwestern shores of the Baltic Sea.

Bodden may also refer to:

 Alonzo Bodden (born 1962), American comedian and actor
 Annie Huldah Bodden (1908-1989), Caymanian civil servant, lawyer, and politician
 Christie Bodden (born 1990), Panamanian former swimmer
 Jacob Bodden (1831-1889), member of the Wisconsin State Assembly
 John Alston Bodden (born 1981), Honduran association football goalkeeper
 Leigh Bodden (born 1981), former American football cornerback
 Olaf Bodden (born 1968), German former football striker
 Truman Bodden (born 1945), Caymanian politician
 Bodden Town (disambiguation), Grand Cayman, Cayman Islands

See also
 Edward Bodden Airfield, Little Cayman, Cayman Islands
 Haig Bodden Stadium, Bodden Town, Cayman Islands
 Truman Bodden Sports Complex, George Town, Cayman Islands